The UFE-III (Ultra Fuel Economy-third generation) is a mini-hybrid concept car being developed by Daihatsu. The vehicle can transport three people (one driver, and two passengers in the rear). The hybrid system comprises a 660-cubic centimeter direct-injection gasoline engine, two motors, and a nickel–metal hydride battery. The body is in polymer and ultra-light aluminum with a canopy door and pointed LED headlamps. The UFE-III has an aerodynamic  drag coefficient (Cd) of 0.168 and is controlled by steer-by-wire technology. Third generation of the "Ultra Fuel Economy" UFE, it was first shown in October 2005 at the Tokyo Motor Show.

References

External links

 
 

Electric vehicles
Hybrid electric cars
Front-wheel-drive vehicles
Kei cars
Hatchbacks
Cars introduced in 2005

UFE-III